Punta Arena Airstrip is a privately owned public-use paved airstrip located to the North East of San Juan de los Planes, Municipality of La Paz, Baja California Sur, Mexico, near the Gulf of California coast, in the area of Punta Arena and Bahía de los Muertos (near the "Bay of Dreams" residential development). This airport is used solely for general aviation purposes. The LAR code is used as identifier.

External links
Baja Bush Pilots Forum about LAR.
Travel report.

Airports in Baja California Sur
La Paz Municipality (Baja California Sur)